Ochyorsky District is an administrative district (raion) of Perm Krai, Russia; one of the thirty-three in the krai. Municipally, it is incorporated as Ochyorsky Municipal District. It is located in the southwest of the krai. Its administrative center is the town of Ochyor. Population:  The population of Ochyor accounts for 62.4% of the district's total population.

Geography
About 48% of the district's territory is covered by forests.

History
The district was established in January 1924, but was abolished between January 1, 1932 and January 25, 1935.

Demographics
Ethnic composition (as of the 2002 Census):
Russians: 95%
Udmurt people: 1.2%

Economy
The economy of the district is based on agriculture and engineering.

References

Notes

Sources

Districts of Perm Krai
States and territories established in 1924
States and territories disestablished in 1932
States and territories established in 1935